Jude Hill (born 2010) is a Northern Irish child actor. He is known for his lead role in Kenneth Branagh's film Belfast (2021) based on Branagh's childhood, for which Hill won the Critics' Choice Award for Best Young Performer.

Early life
Hill was born in Gilford, a village in County Down near Armagh to parents Shauneen and Darryl. He has a younger sister and a younger brother. He attended St John's Primary School. He took drama classes at the Shelley Lowry School in Portadown from the age of four.

Career
Hill made his feature film debut in Kenneth Branagh's Belfast. The film's story is mostly told through the eyes of Hill's character Buddy, "a smart, cheery 9-year-old and a fictional version of Branagh himself", as described by Jeanette Catsoulis of The New York Times. Hill was nine when he was cast as the film's lead out of 300 young actors who auditioned, ten when filming took place, and eleven when the film premiered in 2021.
 
Hill also played the titular role in the World War II-set short film Rian, which premiered at the 2021 CineMagic. In December 2021, Hill signed with United Talent Agency stateside.

In 2022, Hill attended Italy's David di Donatello ceremony as a special guest, picking up the Best Foreign Film award won by Belfast. In the same year, he made his television debut in Magpie Murders, a BritBox and PBS Masterpiece adaptation of the 2016 mystery novel of the same by Anthony Horowitz. He also appeared alongside Deirdre Mullins in the horror film Mandrake.

Filmography

Awards and nominations

References

External links

Living people
21st-century male actors from Northern Ireland
Male child actors from Northern Ireland
People from County Down
2010 births